This is a list of the Sweden national football team results from 2010.

List of matches

2010

2011

2012

2013

2014

2015

2016

2017

2018

2019

External links
Results at RSSSF 

2010s in Sweden
2010